Mehmet Fatih Kale (born 30 May 1968) is a Turkish/Taiwanese Football and Futsal coach, and known for his contributions to the development of Women's football and futsal development in Taiwan. In 2014, Kale established the first ever women's Futsal National Team for the Chinese Taipei Football Association. Kale was granted Republic of China (Taiwan) citizenship in January 2018 due to his long time contributions to the sports in the country. Kale is the first football coach from Taiwan to work as head coach of an other nation with his stints in Brunei and Laos. After a year of absence due to covid restrictions, he joined the Turkish club Gençlerbirliği to create a women's football program for the club.

Managerial statistic

Coaching Achievements 

2006 Taipei International Futsal Tournament (Taipei Select Men's Futsal Team) Runners up

2008 Taiwan Women's Futsal Championship (Taipei-SCSC Club) Champion

2009 Taiwan Women's Football League (Taipei-SCSC Club) Champion

2011~2015 (5years back to back)Taiwan Women's Futsal Championship (Taipei-SCSC Club) Champion

Honors
2009 Chinese Taipei Football Association "Coach of The Year" award

Notes and references

External links
Futsalplanet news 

JFA match report 

Futsal coaches
1968 births
Living people
Taiwanese people of Turkish descent
Turkish sports coaches
Naturalised citizens of Taiwan